Kenau  is a 2014 Dutch / Hungarian / Belgian action film directed by Maarten Treurniet. The film is inspired by the true story of Kenau who led an army of women in the siege of Haarlem by the Spaniards in 1572 during the Eighty Years' War between the Netherlands and Spain.

The filmmakers admitted that much of the story is fiction, such as the execution of her daughter, and the relationship with her youngest daughter. 
And in general there's isn't much known of the historical Kenau figure. In 1956, Haarlem archivist Gerda Kurtz demythologised the story of Kenau and her women's squabbles in his book Kenu Symonsdochter van Haerlem. According to Kurtz, it was unusual for Dutch women to fight in wartime. It seems more likely that Kenau played an active role in wall repairs.

Cast 
 Monic Hendrickx as Kenau Simonsdochter Hasselaer
 Barry Atsma as Wigbold Ripperda
 Sallie Harmsen as Kathelijne
 Lisa Smit as Gertruide
 Matthijs van de Sande Bakhuyzen as Pieter Ripperda
  as Bertha
  as Magdalena

References

External links 

2014 action films
Dutch action films
Dutch drama films
Hungarian drama films
Belgian action films
Belgian drama films
Films set in the 1570s